Antoine-Marin Lemierre (12 January 17334 July 1793) was a French dramatist and poet.

Life
He was born in Paris, into a poor family, but found a patron in the collector-general of taxes, Dupin, whose secretary he became. Lemierre gained his first success on the stage with Hypermnestre (1758); Titre (1761) and Idomne (1764) failed on account of the subjects. Artaxerce, modelled on Metastasio, and Guillaume Tell were produced in 1766; other successful tragedies were La Veuve de Malabar (1770) and Barnavelt (1784). He was admitted to the Académie française in 1780.

Lemierre revived Guillaume Tell in 1786 with enormous success. After the French Revolution he professed great remorse for the production of a play inculcating revolutionary principles, and there is no doubt that the horror of the excesses he witnessed hastened his death. Lemierre published La Peinture (1769), based on a Latin poem by the abbé de Marsy, and a poem in six cantos. Les Fastes, ou les usages de lannie (1779), an unsatisfactory imitation of Ovid's Fasti.

His Œuvres (1810) contain a notice of Lemierre by R. Perrin. and his Œuvres choisies (1811) contain one by F. Fayolle.

References

Attribution:

Writers from Paris
1733 births
1793 deaths
18th-century French poets
18th-century French male writers
18th-century French dramatists and playwrights
Members of the Académie Française